Seriation is a way of situating an object within a series. It may refer to:
Seriation (archaeology)
Seriation (semiotics)
Seriation (statistics)